
Year 772 (DCCLXXII) was a leap year starting on Wednesday (link will display the full calendar) of the Julian calendar. The denomination 772 for this year has been used since the early medieval period, when the Anno Domini calendar era became the prevalent method in Europe for naming years.

Events 
 By place 
 Europe 
 Saxon Wars: King Charlemagne leads a Frankish expedition from the Middle Rhine into disputed territory lost by the Franks in 695. He starts a campaign against the Saxons and seizes Eresburg, destroying the Irminsul (Saxon sacred tree) near Paderborn. Charlemagne devastates several major Saxon strongholds, and forces them to retreat beyond the Weser River. After negotiating with some Saxon nobles and obtaining hostages, he installs a number of garrisons.
 King Desiderius of the Lombards, enraged by the repudiation by Charlemagne of his daughter Desiderata, proclaims Gerberga's sons lawful heirs to the Frankish throne. He attacks Pope Adrian I for refusing to crown them, and invades the Duchy of the Pentapolis. Desiderius marches on Rome, and Adrian turns to the Franks for military support.
 In England, King Offa of Mercia attempts to rule Kent directly, possibly to depose his rival Egbert II (approximate date).

 Asia 
 Abbasid caliph Al-Mansur completes construction of the garrison city of al-Rāfiqah adjacent to Raqqa.

 By topic 
 Religion 
 February 1 – Pope Stephen III dies after a 3½-year reign, in which he has approved the acceptable reverence of icons in the Eastern Church. He is succeeded by Adrian I (also referred to as Hadrian) as the 95th pope of Rome.

Births 
 Bai Ju Yi, Chinese poet and official (d. 846)
 Cui Qun, chancellor of the Tang Dynasty (d. 832)
 Cui Zhi, chancellor of the Tang Dynasty (d. 829)
 Li Ao, Chinese philosopher and prose writer (d. 841)
 Liu Yuxi, Chinese poet and philosopher (d. 842)
probable 
Charles the Younger, son of Charlemagne (d. 811)

Deaths 
 February 1 – Pope Stephen III
 May 13 – Dōkyō, Japanese Buddhist monk (b. 700)
 July 10 – Amalberga of Temse, Lotharingian nun and saint (b. 741)
date unknown
 Dúngal mac Cellaig, king of Osraige (Ireland)
 Yuan Jie, Chinese poet
 Zhu Xicai, general of the Tang Dynasty

References